

Events
In Britain, William Boyce is appointed Master of the King's Musick.
After a tour of Ireland fraught with disagreements, Thomas Arne and his wife, the soprano Cecilia Young, agree to separate.
Ferdinando Bertoni becomes choirmaster at the Ospedale dei Mendicanti in Venice.

Published popular music
James Oswald – [48] Airs for the Spring/Summer/Autumn/Winter, for violin or flute and basso continuo (London)
Mme Papavoine – Nous voici donc au jour de l'an. Étrennes (Paris)

Classical music
Charles Avison – Eight Concertos, Op. 4 (London) 
Carl Philipp Emanuel Bach
Harpsichord Concerto in F major, H.443 Wq. 33
Keyboard Concerto in G major, H.444 Wq. 34
Flute Concerto in G major, H.445 Wq. 169
Trio Sonata in B-flat major, H.587 Wq. 159
Symphony in D major, H.651 Wq. 176
Gaspard Fritz – 6 Violin Sonatas (published in Paris as Sei sonate, Op. 3, in 1756)
Francesco Geminiani – Six Concertos, Op. 2, second edition, corrected and enlarged, with some new movements, by the author, and now published in score (London: John Johnson); originally published 1732
Carl Heinrich Graun – Der Tod Jesu
Leopold Mozart – Divertimento in F major "Musical Sleigh Ride"
John Christopher Smith – Six Suits  of Lessons for the Harpsichord, Op. 3 (London: John Walsh)
Georg Philipp Telemann – Der Tod Jesu TWV 5:6

Opera
Johann Friedrich Agricola – Il tempio d'amore
Pierre Montan Berton – Deucalion et Pyrrha
Egidio Duni – L'Olimpiade
Baldassare Galuppi 
La diavolessa
Le nozze di Dorina (premiered Nov. in Venice)
Carl Heinrich Graun – Montezuma (libretto by King Frederick the Great, composed 1754 first performed Jan. 6, 1755)
Johann Adolph Hasse – Ezio (Final version premiered Jan. 20 in Dresden)
Niccolò Jommelli – Pelope
Antonio Mazzoni – Antigono (Was not performed because of the Lisbon Earthquake, premiered in 2011)
John Christopher Smith – The Fairies

Methods and theory writings 

 Touissant Bordet – Méthode raisonnée pour apprendre la musique
 Marianus Königsperger – Der wohl-unterwiesene Clavier-Schüler
 Friedrich Wilhelm Marpurg – Anleitung zum Clavierspielen
 Christoph Nichelmann – Die Melodie
 Johann Joachim Quantz – Autobiography 
 Jean-Philippe Rameau – Erreurs sur la musique dans l'Encyclopédie
 Georg Andreas Sorge – Ausweichungs-Tabellen

Births
January 16 – Maria Theresia Ahlefeldt, composer (died 1810)
February 5 – Caroline Müller, operatic mezzo-soprano, actress and dancer (died 1826)
March 2 – Antoine-Frédéric Gresnick, opera composer (died 1799)
April 16 – Louise-Élisabeth Vigée-Le Brun, copyist and painter (died 1842)
May 12 – Giovanni Battista Viotti (died 1824)
June 1 – Federigo Fiorillo, arranger and composer (died 1823)
June 18 – Louise-Rosalie Lefebvre, operatic mezzo-soprano, actress and dancer (died 1821)
August 1 – Antonio Capuzzi, composer and violinist (died 1818)
November 8 – Edmond de Favières, French librettist (died 1837)
November 10 – Franz Anton Ries, violinist (died 1846)
November 30 – Agnieszka Truskolaska, opera singer (died 1831)
date unknown – John Christopher Moller, early American composer (died 1803)

Deaths
January 11 – Joseph-Nicolas-Pancrace Royer, harpsichordist and composer (born c.1705)
January 15 – Azzolino Bernardino Della Ciaja, Italian composer (born 1671)
January 19 – Jean-Pierre Christin, scientist and musician (born 1683)
April – Anastasia Robinson, operatic soprano (born c.1692)
April 30 – Jean-Baptiste Oudry, composer and painter (born 1686)
June 21 – Giovanni Porta, opera composer (born c.1675)
July 4 – John Cennick, hymn-writer (born 1718)
July 6 – Pietro Paolo Bencini, Italian composer and Kapellmeister (born c.1670)
July 9 – Johann Gottlob Harrer, German composer and choir leader (born 1703)
September 30 – Francesco Durante, composer (born 1684)
October 4 – Sir John Clerk, 2nd Baronet, of Penycuik, composer (born 1676)
October 28 – Joseph Bodin de Boismortier (born 1689)
November 25 – Johann Georg Pisendel, composer (born 1687)
December 1 – Maurice Greene, organist and composer (born 1696)
December 8 – Jean-Baptiste Stuck, cellist and composer (born 1680)
date unknown 
José Elías, composer and organist (born c. 1678)
Alexander Gordon, antiquary and singer (born c.1692)
Manuel de Zumaya, Mexican composer (born c.1678)

References

 
18th century in music
Music by year